Ngura is a village in Ancuabe District, Cabo Delgado Province, in northeastern Mozambique. It is located north of the district capital of Ancuabe.

References

External links 
Satellite map at Maplandia.com 

Populated places in Ancuabe District